Barbara Eve Harris (born Barbara Evadney Reid-Hibbert; March 8, 1959) is a Tobagonian-Canadian actress, known for her supporting performances on television. She is best known for her role as FBI Agent Felicia Lang on Prison Break.

Life and career
Harris was born in Tobago, to Jamaican parents, and immigrated with her family to Canada at the age of six. She has made over 60 television appearances and co-starred in a number of feature films.

Harris starred in the Canadian drama series Side Effects from 1994 to 1996. For her performance on the show, she was nominated for the Gemini Award for Best Performance by an Actress in a Continuing Leading Dramatic Role. On American television she guest-starred in Knots Landing, Party of Five, The West Wing, The Practice, CSI: Miami, ER, JAG, Commander in Chief, Private Practice, Brothers & Sisters, Criminal Minds, NCIS, Rizzoli & Isles and Revenge (TV series). She also appeared in a number of made for television films, like Woman on the Run: The Lawrencia Bembenek Story (1993), Against Their Will: Women in Prison (1994) and Captive Heart: The James Mink Story (1996).

Harris had a recurring role as FBI Agent Felicia Lang in the Fox drama series Prison Break from 2006 to 2009 and later appeared in Prison Break: The Final Break. From 2011 to 2012, she had another recurring role on CSI: Crime Scene Investigation as Sheriff Sherry Liston.

In 2014, Harris was cast as Lt. Marcia Roark in the ABC drama series Forever. After ABC picked up the pilot to series, Harris was replaced by Lorraine Toussaint as the new lieutenant. From 2015 to 2017, she had a recurring role as Commander Emma Crowley in Chicago P.D. and Chicago Fire. She co-starred in the HBO miniseries Sharp Objects in 2018, and in 2020 in Netflix thriller Messiah.

Filmography

Film

Television

References

External links

1959 births
Canadian people of Jamaican descent
20th-century Canadian actresses
21st-century Canadian actresses
Canadian film actresses
Canadian television actresses
Trinidad and Tobago emigrants to Canada
Place of birth missing (living people)
Living people